Crowea saligna, commonly known as willow-leaved crowea,  is a plant in the rue family, Rutaceae and is endemic to eastern New South Wales in Australia. It is a small shrub with attractive, pink, star-shaped flowers and is commonly cultivated.

Description
They are also dark green, shiny, dotted with oil glands and there is a distinct mid-vein.

The flowers develop in the axils of leaves on a stalk 5-13 millimetres (<1/2 inch) long. There are 5 short, broad sepals and 5 overlapping petals forming a "star" shape. The petals are pink, sometimes white and are 12-18 millimetres (1/2-1 inch) long. The stamens are hairy and enclose the centre of the flower. The flowers appear from January to June and the fruits that follow are dry and have 5 compartments which open to release 2 seeds each.

Taxonomy and naming
Crowea saligna was first formally described in 1800 by Henry Cranke Andrews. The description was published in The Botanist's Repository for New, and Rare Plants. The specific epithet (saligna) is a Latin word meaning " of willow".

Distribution and habitat
Willow-leaved crowea occurs in Sydney between Woy Woy and Yerrinbool and on the adjacent Blue Mountains. It grows in sheltered locations on sandstone.

Use in horticulture
Crowea saligna is widely cultivated due to its attractive flowers that appear when most other species are dormant. It prefers a well-drained position in sun or semi shade. It grows best in moist soils but will tolerate extended dry periods once established.

References

Flora of New South Wales
Sapindales of Australia
Plants described in 1800
Zanthoxyloideae
Taxa named by Henry Cranke Andrews